The Fussball Club Basel 1893 1985–86 season was their 92nd season since their foundation on 15 November 1893. It was the club's 40th consecutive season in the top flight of Swiss football since their promotion in the 1945–46 season. FC Basel played their home games in the St. Jakob Stadium. Urs Gribi was the club's chairman for the third consecutive year.

Overview

Pre-season
Helmut Benthaus returned as first team manager, after his successful three-year term with VfB Stuttgart in which they won the Bundesliga in the 1983–84 season. He took over from caretaker manager Emil Müller. A number of players left the squad. Former Netherlands international Adrie van Kraay retired from active football. Swiss international player Martin Andermatt moved on to Grasshopper Club and Livio Bordoli moved on to Locarno. Two players, Beat Feigenwinter and Nicolas Keller, left the first team squad and went to play for the reserve team. In the other direction Gerhard Strack signed in from 1. FC Köln, André Ladner and Marco Schällibaum both signed in from Grasshopper Club, Francois Laydu signed in from La Chaux-de-Fonds and local lad Enrique Mata joined after a three season period by Xamax. Further, another local lad Stefano Ceccaroni returned from his one season loan to Baden.

In this season Basel played a total of 51 games. 30 matches were played in the domestic league, five in the Swiss Cup and 16 were friendly matches. Of their 16 test games, 12 ended with a victory, one was drawn, three ended with a defeat, the team scored 78 goals and conceded 18. Only one of these test games were played at home in St. Jakob Stadium, against Bayern Munich, all the others were all played away.

Domestic league
Basel played in the 1985–86 Nationalliga A, which was contested by 16 teams, these being the top 14 clubs from the previous 1984–85 season and the two promoted teams from the second level Nationalliga B the previous season, these being Grenchen and Baden. he league was contested in a double round robin format, with each club playing every other club twice, home and away. Two points were awarded for a win and one point given to each team for a draw. The champions would be qualified for 1986–87 European Cup and the next two teams in the league would be qualified for the 1986–87 UEFA Cup.

Basel ended the season in tenth position, 14 points behind BSC Young Boys who became that seasons champions and qualified for the 1986–87 European Cup. In their 30 league championship matches Basel won ten games, drew ten and also lost ten, which meant that they obtained 30 points. They scored 44 and conceding 40 goals. Erni Maissen was the team's top league goal scorer with 14 goals, Enrique Mata scored seven, Thomas Hauser scored five. Xamax and Luzern qualified for the 1986–87 UEFA Cup. The two newly promoted teams Grenchen and Baden suffered relegation.

Swiss Cup
Basel entered the Swiss Cup in the round of 64 with an away game against lower classed Concordia Basel. The game was played in the St. Jakob Stadium, in which Concordia had home team status, in front of 1,800 spectators and Basel won 9–1. They continued to the round of 32 in which they had a home game against FC Vernier, which was won 6–0. In the round of 16 they had a home game against Lausanne Sports, which ended in a 4–1 victory. The quarterfinal was played as visitors to lower classed FC Lengnau and with a 6–0 victory, Basel advanced to the semifinal. The semi final was played at home in front of 12,000 spectators against Servette on 15 April 1986 and Servette took an early three-goal lead. A hat trick form Gerhard Strack in the last 22 minutes of regular time meant that the match had to go into overtime. But with a penalty goal against them in the 4 minute of the extra time meant that Basel did not reach the final. Sion beat Servette in the final and as Cup winners were qualified for the 1986–87 Cup Winners' Cup.

Players 

 
 

 

 

 
 

 

 
 
 

Players who left the squad

Results 
Legend

Friendly matches

Pre- and mid-season

Winter break

Nationalliga A

League matches

League table

Swiss Cup

See also
 History of FC Basel
 List of FC Basel players
 List of FC Basel seasons

References

Sources 
 Rotblau: Jahrbuch Saison 2015/2016. Publisher: FC Basel Marketing AG. 
 Die ersten 125 Jahre. Publisher: Josef Zindel im Friedrich Reinhardt Verlag, Basel. 
 The FCB squad 1985–86 at fcb-archiv.ch
 Switzerland 1985–86 at RSSSF

External links
 FC Basel official site

FC Basel seasons
Basel